Evan Lewis Press is a Welsh footballer who plays as a midfielder for Welsh Premier League side Barry Town United.

Playing career
Press came through the Newport County youth team to make his first team debut on 7 November 2017, in a 2–1 defeat to Cheltenham Town in an EFL Trophy group stage match at Rodney Parade. He was released at the end of the 2017-18 season and joined Barry Town United.

Career statistics

External links

References

Living people
Welsh footballers
Association football midfielders
Newport County A.F.C. players
2000 births
Barry Town United F.C. players
Cymru Premier players